Parliamentary elections were held in North Korea on 28 February 1982 to elect the 615 members of the seventh Supreme People's Assembly. The first session convened on April 5, 1982. The "Decision on expediting self-reliance and peaceful reunification of the fatherland by securing the guarantee of peace" was placed as the agenda.

Results

References

External links
North Korean parliamentary election, 1982 at Inter-Parliamentary Union

Elections in North Korea
Parliamentary
North Korea
Supreme People's Assembly
North Korea
Election and referendum articles with incomplete results